The Tao of Zen is a nonfiction book by Ray Grigg, published by Charles E. Tuttle Company in 1994, and reprinted by Alva Press in 1999.

The work argues that what we recognize as traditional Chinese Ch’an/Japanese Zen Buddhism is in fact almost entirely grounded in Chinese Taoist philosophy, though this fact is well shrouded by the persistence of Mahayana Buddhist institutional trappings.  Utilizing an array of scholarly commentary on the two traditions and historical deduction from what can be considered to be the best primary source material available, the author traces the development of Taoism and Buddhism in China and Japan for two millennia.  

The story unfolds in China as Buddhism appears on the scene and is accepted by the Chinese population as a “simplified version of Taoism” that the Western barbarians (subcontinent Indians and Central Asians, e.g. Tibetans, et al.) could understand. They shared many philosophical similarities that made Chinese acclimation to Buddhism much easier – but the more dogmatic ways in which Buddhism was practiced helped it to get the fast track on becoming the predominant religion in China. 

Its predisposition to monastic institutionalization throughout the empire allowed it to eventually assimilate and co-opt Taoist perspectives. The dominance of the Ch’an Buddhist tradition was most responsible for this trend. However, when it was eventually exported to Japan, the Taoist strands had the opportunity in a new cultural framework to once again assert themselves.  

Grigg is able to trace the submergence and eventual resurgence of Taoism in Japan and the modern West by identifying how its specific tendencies (paradox, nonduality, aversion to institutionalization, emphasis on informal and varied paths to “enlightenment”, focus on the practical matters of influencing the social world, etc.) clearly manifested themselves in very different times and places.  

What he seeks to do in this book is vindicate the importance of Taoist thought in the Chinese religious history and displace the notion of Zen Buddhism as a coherent whole. To him, these are very different spiritual systems that only coexist today because of the almost wholly unacknowledged lingering of the original Buddhist colonization of Taoist China. The popularity of Zen today owes much more to its persistent Taoist origins than to Buddhist doctrine.

References
 Grigg, Ray (1994) The Tao of Zen, Tuttle Publishing. 

1994 non-fiction books
Philosophy books
Zen studies books
Works about Taoism
Tuttle Publishing books